The 2000–01 international cricket season was from September 2000 to April 2001.

Season overview

September

New Zealand in Zimbabwe

October

2000 ICC KnockOut Trophy

2000–01 Sharjah Champions Trophy

England in Pakistan

New Zealand in South Africa

November

India in Bangladesh

Zimbabwe in India

West Indies in Australia

December

Sri Lanka in South Africa

Zimbabwe in New Zealand

January

2000–01 Australia Tri-Nation Series

Sri Lanka in New Zealand

February

England in Sri Lanka

Pakistan in New Zealand

Australia in India

March

South Africa in the West Indies

April

Bangladesh in Zimbabwe

2000–01 ARY Gold Cup

References

 
2000 in cricket
2001 in cricket